Mazidabad (also Romanized as Mazīdābād; also known as Marzīdābād, Maziawa, and Mazlava) is a village in Sojas Rud Rural District, Sojas Rud District, Khodabandeh County, Zanjan Province, Iran. At the 2006 census, its population was 960, in 203 families.

References 

Populated places in Khodabandeh County